In enzymology, a formaldehyde transketolase is an enzyme that catalyzes the chemical reaction

D-xylulose 5-phosphate + formaldehyde  glyceraldehyde 3-phosphate + glycerone

Thus, the two substrates of this enzyme are D-xylulose 5-phosphate and formaldehyde, whereas its two products are glyceraldehyde 3-phosphate and glycerone.

This enzyme belongs to the family of transferases, specifically those transferring aldehyde or ketonic groups (transaldolases and transketolases, respectively).  The systematic name of this enzyme class is D-xylulose-5-phosphate:formaldehyde glycolaldehydetransferase. This enzyme is also called dihydroxyacetone synthase.  This enzyme participates in methane metabolism.  It employs one cofactor, thiamin diphosphate.

References

 
 
 

EC 2.2.1
Thiamine enzymes
Enzymes of unknown structure